A compass is a navigational instrument that indicates the direction to the magnetic poles.

Compass may also refer to:

Measurement 
Compass calipers, a tool to measure distances on a chart or map
Compass (architecture), a curved circular form
Compass (drawing tool), a tool to inscribe circles and arcs

Art and entertainment
Compass (novel), a 2015 novel by Mathias Enard
Compass (Hudson), a 2005 public artwork by American artist Jon Barlow Hudson
Compass (Simpson), a 2003 public art work by American artist Gail Simpson
Compass Players (or Compass Theater), a 1950s improvised cabaret revue in Chicago, Illinois

Music
Compass or range, of a voice or musical instrument
Compass (band), a Chinese rock band
Compass (Assemblage 23 album), 2009
Compass (Jamie Lidell album), 2010
Compass (Mark Vincent album), 2010
Compass (Mark Vincent song), 2010 (later recorded by Didrik Solli-Tangen, and Sam Bailey)
Compass (Joshua Redman album), 2013
Compass (Lady Antebellum song), 2013
Compass Records, an independent record label founded in 1995
"Compass", a song by Dala from the album Everyone Is Someone
"Compass", a song by Jonathan Thulin from the album Science Fiction
"Compass", a song by Rascal Flatts from the album Rewind
"Compass", a song by Zella Day from the album Kicker

Television
Compass (1965 TV program), a 1965–1966 Canadian documentary television program
Compass (1986 TV program), a 1986 local Canadian television news program about Prince Edward Island
Compass (Australian TV program), a 1988 Australian news-documentary television program
Compass (Falling Skies), an episode of the American television drama series Falling Skies

Business and organizations 
Compass, Inc., an American real estate brokerage
Compass (think tank), a British left-wing political think tank
Compass Airlines (Australia), operated 1990–1993
Compass Airlines (North America), a subsidiary of Delta Air Lines
Compass Design Automation, a former integrated circuit design company
Compass Group, a British food-service and facilities-management company
Compass International Pictures, an American film-distribution company
Massachusetts Computer Associates, also known as COMPASS
Project Compass, a British programme to help ex-service personnel

Nature 
Compass cactus or barrel cactus, members of the genera Echinocactus and Ferocactus
Compass plant (Silphium laciniatum), a kind of sunflower
 Pyxis, abbreviated from Pyxis Nautica, Latin for mariner's compass, southern constellation

Publications
The Daily Compass, a 1949–1952 New York City, New York, newspaper
Social Work (journal), an academic journal known as The Compass from 1920 to 1948

Science and technology

Navigation
Brunton compass, type of precision magnetic compass
Breithaupt compass or Geological compass
Hand compass, any compact magnetic compass capable of one-hand use
Radio direction finder, a tool used in direction finding that coincides with radio communications
An alternative name of BeiDou Navigation Satellite System, which used the satellite Compass-M1

Traffic
Compass Card (San Diego), a contactless smart card used for public transit in San Diego, California
Compass Card (TransLink), an electronic payment system used for public transit in Vancouver, Canada
COMPASS, the Freeway Traffic Management System, a traffic management system in Canada

Other
COMPASS or COMPrehensive ASSembler, a programming language for CDC mainframe computers in the 1960s and 1970s
COMPASS experiment or Common Muon and Proton Apparatus for Structure and Spectroscopy, a particle physics experiment at CERN
COMPASS tokamak,  an experimental facility of Tokamak department of Institute of Plasma Physics AS CR
Grid Compass, the first laptop computer
Jeep Compass, a compact crossover SUV
Compass Project is the former name of Elasticsearch, a Java search engine framework
An alternative name of BeiDou Navigation Satellite System, which used the satellite Compass-M1

Other uses 
Compass (law), to purpose (or intend) something
Compass, Pennsylvania, United States
Operation Compass, a World War II military operation in the North African campaign
Political compass, a multi-axis model used to label or organize political thought

See also 
 
Compas (disambiguation)